Hotel Bristol, Warsaw is a historic five-star luxury hotel built in the Neo-Renaissance style and opened in 1901 in Warsaw, Poland. It is located in the city centre on Krakowskie Przedmieście next to the Presidential Palace. 

The hotel is one of the most notable historic monuments of the Royal Route (Polish: Trakt Królewski) and remains among the few landmarks of Warsaw which emerged relatively unscathed from the city's near total destruction during World War II. It is considered as Warsaw's oldest and one of the country's most luxurious hotels.

History 

The Hotel Bristol was constructed from 1899-1900 on the site of the Tarnowski Palace by a company whose partners included Polish pianist Ignacy Jan Paderewski. A competition was held for the design of the building, and architects Tadeusz Stryjeński and Franciszek Mączyński won with their Art Nouveau design. However the builders decided to change the style to a Neo-Renaissance design, and brought in architect Władysław Marconi to design the final hotel. Some of its interiors were designed by the noted Viennese architect Otto Wagner Jr. The cornerstone was laid on April 22, 1899 and the hotel was dedicated on November 17, 1901 and opened on November 19, 1901. Among the notable features of the newly-built hotel was the country's first elevator. The hotel also housed the photo studio of Jadwiga Golcz which was frequented by many well-known artists of the time.

After Poland gained its independence in 1919, Paderewski became the Prime Minister and held the first session of his government at his hotel. Paderewski and his partners sold their shares in the hotel in 1928 to Bank Cukrownictwa, a local bank which renovated the hotel in 1934 with modern interiors by designer Antoni Jawornicki. In the 1930s, one of the hotel rooms on the fifth floor served as an atelier of painter Wojciech Kossak.

Upon the German invasion in 1939, the hotel was made into the headquarters of the Chief of the Warsaw District. It miraculously survived the war relatively unscathed, standing nearly alone among the rubble of its neighborhood. Following the war, the hotel was renovated and reopened in 1945. 

The City of Warsaw took over operation of the hotel in 1947 and it was nationalized in 1948 and joined the state-run Orbis chain in 1952, exclusively serving visitors from abroad. In 1965, the hotel was inscribed onto the Registry of Cultural Property. By the 1970s its outdated facilities had seen it demoted to a second class ranking by the government and the hotel was donated by Prime Minister Piotr Jaroszewicz to the University of Warsaw in 1977 to eventually serve as their library. It closed in 1981. However no work was done and the building languished through the waning days of the Communist government.

After the fall of Communism in 1989, the hotel was finally completely restored it to its former glory from 1991-1993, with the original interiors of the public rooms recreated to match the 1901 designs. The Bristol was reopened on April 17, 1993, with Margaret Thatcher in attendance, as part of the British Forte Hotels chain. From 1998 to 2013, the hotel was part of the Le Méridien hotel chain and was known as Le Royal Méridien Bristol. The exterior was further restored in 2005, and the interior redecorated in 2013, after which the hotel joined The Luxury Collection. Currently, the hotel offers 165 rooms as well as 41 suites.

Famous guests
Throughout its long history, the Hotel Bristol was visited by a number of prominent guests from all over the world, some of which include:

Woody Allen
Paul Anka
Eugeniusz Bodo
George H. W. Bush
José Carreras
Enrico Caruso
Naomi Campbell
Ray Charles
Jacques Chirac
Marie Curie
Dalai Lama
Gerard Depardieu
Marlene Dietrich
Elizabeth II
Margot Fonteyn
Dave Gahan
Bill Gates
Günter Grass
Edvard Grieg
Herbert Hoover
Mick Jagger
John Fitzgerald Kennedy
Jan Kiepura
Helmut Kohl
Sophia Loren
Paul McCartney
Angela Merkel
Pablo Neruda
Jacqueline Kennedy Onassis
Ignacy Jan Paderewski
Pablo Picasso
Józef Piłsudski
Michel Platini
Lionel Richie
Artur Rubinstein
Richard Strauss
Karol Szymanowski
Wisława Szymborska
Margaret Thatcher
Tina Turner

Gallery

See also
Hotel Bristol
History of Warsaw
Tourism in Poland

References

 Hotel history

External links

Official website

Bristol
Bristol
Renaissance Revival architecture in Poland
Bristol
1900 establishments in Poland
Art Nouveau architecture in Poland
Bristol
Otto Wagner buildings
1900 establishments in the Russian Empire